Thihathura or Thiha Thura was a Burmese royal title. Today, Thiha Thura is the second highest military decoration awarded by the Burmese military.

Thihathura may mean:

Royalty
 King Thihathu: Co-founder of Myinsaing Kingdom (r. 1298–1312) and founder of Pinya Kingdom (r. 1312–1324)
 King Thihathu of Ava: King of Ava (r. 1422–1426)
 King Narapati of Ava: King of Ava (r. 1443–1469)
 King Thihathura of Ava:  King of Ava (r. 1469–1481)
 King Thihathura II of Ava: Joint-King of Ava (r. 1487–1502)
 King Nyaungyan: King of Burma (r. 1599–1606)
 Crown Prince Thado Minsaw: Crown Prince of Burma (r. 1783–1808)

Generals and ministers
 Gen. Maha Thiha Thura (d. 1782): Konbaung-era general
 Myawaddy Mingyi U Sa (1766–1853): Konbaung-era poet, playwright composer, military commander, statesman

Modern era
 Tin Aung Myint Oo: First Secretary of State Peace and Development Council

Burmese royal titles